Skövde Municipality (Skövde kommun) is a municipality in Västra Götaland County in western Sweden. Its seat is located in the city of Skövde.

The present municipality was formed in 1971 when the City of Skövde was amalgamated with five surrounding municipalities. The number of original entities (as of 1863) is nearly 30. They had in 1952 been reduced to six.

Economy

The single largest employer in the municipality is Volvo, with Volvo Powertrain and Volvo Cars together employing approximately 5,000 people.

Other major employers are the hospital (Skaraborg Hospital, serving the Västra Götaland region), the local regiments (among Sweden's largest) and the municipality itself.

Education

University of Skövde is the largest university in the town. It is ranked 21 in the nation's ranking. Informatics and computer science along with Bio-informatics and molecular biology are some of the chief international students picks.

Elections

Riksdag
These are the local results of the Riksdag elections since the 1972 municipality reform. The results of the Sweden Democrats were not published by SCB between 1988 and 1998 at a municipal level to the party's small nationwide size at the time. "Votes" denotes valid votes, whereas "Turnout" denotes also blank and invalid votes.

Blocs

This lists the relative strength of the socialist and centre-right blocs since 1973, but parties not elected to the Riksdag are inserted as "other", including the Sweden Democrats results from 1988 to 2006, but also the Christian Democrats pre-1991 and the Greens in 1982, 1985 and 1991. The sources are identical to the table above. The coalition or government mandate marked in bold formed the government after the election. New Democracy got elected in 1991 but are still listed as "other" due to the short lifespan of the party. "Elected" is the total number of percentage points from the municipality that went to parties who were elected to the Riksdag.

Twin cities
 Halden, Norway, since the 1940s
 Ringsted Municipality, Denmark, since the 1940s
 Sastamala, Finland, since the 1940s
 Kuressaare, Estonia, since 1994

References

External links

  

 
Municipalities of Västra Götaland County
Skaraborg